Jeffrey Clark Lagarias (born November 16, 1949 in Pittsburgh, Pennsylvania, United States) is a mathematician and professor at the University of Michigan.

Education 
While in high school in 1966, Lagarias studied astronomy at the Summer Science Program.

He completed an S.B. and S.M. in Mathematics at the Massachusetts Institute of Technology in 1972. The title of his thesis was "Evaluation of certain character sums". He was a Putnam Fellow at MIT in 1970. He received his Ph.D. in Mathematics from MIT for his thesis "The 4-part of the class group of a quadratic field", in 1974. His advisor for both his masters and Ph.D was Harold Stark.

Career 
In 1975, he joined AT&T Bell Laboratories and eventually became Distinguished Member of Technical Staff. Since 1995, he has been a Technology Consultant at AT&T Research Laboratories. In 2002, he moved to Michigan to work at the University and settle down with his family.

While his recent work has been in theoretical computer science, his original training was in analytic algebraic number theory. He has since worked in many areas, both pure and applied, and considers himself a mathematical generalist. 

Lagarias discovered an elementary problem that is equivalent to the Riemann hypothesis, namely whether
for all n > 0, we have

with equality only when n = 1. Here Hn is the nth harmonic number, the sum of the reciprocals of the first  positive integers, and σ(n) is the divisor function, the sum of the positive divisors of n. 

He disproved Keller's conjecture in dimensions at least 10. Lagarias has also done work on the Collatz conjecture and Li's criterion and has written several highly cited papers in symbolic computation with Dave Bayer.

Awards and honors
He received in 1986 a Lester R. Ford award from the Mathematical Association of America and again in 2007.

In 2012, he became a fellow of the American Mathematical Society.

References

External links 

Jeffrey Clark Lagarias homepage, University of Michigan

1949 births
Living people
Scientists from Pittsburgh
Massachusetts Institute of Technology School of Science alumni
Scientists at Bell Labs
20th-century American  mathematicians
21st-century  American  mathematicians
Number theorists
American computer scientists
Theoretical computer scientists
University of Michigan faculty
Putnam Fellows
Summer Science Program
Fellows of the American Mathematical Society
Fellows of the Society for Industrial and Applied Mathematics